The Diocese of Altoona–Johnstown is a Latin Church ecclesiastical territory or diocese of the Catholic Church in Pennsylvania. It was established on May 30, 1901, as the Diocese of Altoona. On October 9, 1957, the name was changed to the Diocese of Altoona-Johnstown. It consists of Bedford, Blair, Cambria, Centre, Clinton, Fulton, Huntingdon and Somerset Counties.

The diocese also sponsors Proclaim!, a weekly Catholic news show, and a weekly live mass from St. John Gualbert Cathedral in Johnstown. The seat of the bishop is in the Cathedral of the Blessed Sacrament. The Diocese of Altoona–Johnstown is a suffragan diocese in the ecclesiastical province of the metropolitan Archdiocese of Philadelphia.

Bishops
The bishops of the diocese and their tenures of service:

Bishops of Altoona
 Eugene A. Garvey (1901-1920)
 John Joseph McCort (1920-1936)
 Richard Thomas Guilfoyle (1936-1957)

Bishops of Altoona-Johnstown
 Howard Joseph Carroll (1957-1960)
 Joseph Carroll McCormick (1960-1966), appointed Bishop of Scranton
 James John Hogan (1966-1986)
 Joseph Victor Adamec (1987-2011)
 Mark Leonard Bartchak (2011–present)

Parishes

 Basilica of Saint Michael the Archangel, Loretto
 Cathedral of the Blessed Sacrament, Altoona
 Saint John Gualbert Cathedral, Johnstown

Schools

High schools
 Bishop Carroll High School, Ebensburg
 Bishop Guilfoyle High School, Altoona
 Bishop McCort High School, Johnstown
 Saint Joseph's Catholic Academy, Boalsburg

Sexual abuse cases
In September 2014, another Diocese, Joseph D. Maurizo Jr. was arrested and charged with possession of child pornography and molesting boys at an orphanage in Honduras. On September 22, 2015, Maurizo was convicted on three counts of sex abuse, one count of possession of child pornography, and one count of illegally transferring money to pay the boys he sexually abused in Honduras. In March 2016, Maurizo received a 17-year prison sentence, which he will serve in Pennsylvania. His sentence was upheld in 2017 after he was denied an appeal to overturn the convictions.

In late 2012 and early 2013, news became public that Brother Stephen Baker – a friar from the Third Order Regular, Province of the Immaculate Conception – had sexually abused children when serving as a trainer at what was formerly known as Bishop McCort High School.

On March 1, 2016, a Pennsylvania grand jury investigating the Roman Catholic Diocese of Altoona–Johnstown reported that at least 50 priests and others associated with the church had abused hundreds of children across nearly half a century, and that diocesan leadership actively concealed the abuse. Much of the abuse happened between the 1940s and 1980s, but many of the victims came forward in more recent decades to report the priest to the diocese. While the report suggested that local law enforcement and prosecutors should have been more aggressive in pursuing victims' stories, it says two former bishops were primarily to blame for the decades of concealment: James Hogan, who served from 1966 to 1986 and died in 2005, and Joseph Adamec, who served from 1987 to 2011 and died in 2019. Those bishops "took actions that further endangered children as they placed their desire to avoid public scandal over the well-being of innocent children ... Priests were returned to ministry with full knowledge they were child predators." Monsignor Michael Servinsky, who served under Hogan, Adamec and the current bishop, Mark Bartchak, were called to testify before a grand jury. In his testimony, Bartchak acknowledged that dozens of Catholic figures who were stationed in the Diocese's small town communities abused children between the 1950s and 1990s. Though it was also acknowledged that Adamec had created a system to ensure that hush money would be supplied to the victims of sex abuse in the diocese, Pennsylvania Attorney General Kathleen Kane, herself a Catholic, refused to file any criminal charges by the time the testimony was made public in March 2016.  Servinsky had also been executive to Bishop Hogan's estate, and, along with Adamec, was named as a co-defendant in a lawsuit which began against accused priest Charles Bodziak which started in 2016. The lawsuit against Bodziak was dismissed in December 2017.

Despite identifying hundreds of cases of suspected abuse, the grand jury and the Pennsylvania Office of the Attorney General were not able to recommend criminal charges, because many of the cases were too old, and the statute of limitations for criminal prosecution had elapsed Bishop James John Hogan and Bishop Joseph Victor Adamec are noted because they covered up abuse and safeguarded the Roman Catholic Church from bad publicity rather than protecting innocent children.

Many of those listed by the Diocese of Altoona-Johnstown are now deceased. However, Maurizo remains incarcerated. Three of the accused clergy who are still alive have been laicized and two were removed from public ministry. The 2016 grand jury report against the Diocese of Altoona-Johnstown also served as the inspiration for a later grand jury investigation against the other six suffragan Dioceses of the Archdiocese of Philadelphia in August 2018.

An August 2018 grand jury investigation of the bishop of Altoona-Johnstown, Mark Bartchak, who was ordained in Erie, criticized his handling of 2005 investigation against former Erie priest William Presley.  The Holy See had assigned Bartchak during this time to investigate claims against Presley, who served in the Erie Diocese between 1963 and 1986, and continuously re-interviewed a male victim who previously disclosed his alleged abuse to the diocese in 1982, 1987 and 2002.  On August 25, 2005, Bartchak sent a secret memo to then-Erie Bishop Donald Walter Trautman.  Parts of the memo read "I was not surprised to learn from other witnesses from the Elk County area, that there are likely to be other victims" and that "it is likely that there may be others who were also of the age for the offenses to be considered delicts, but to what end is it necessary to follow every lead?"  Bartchak also stated in another secret memo following a meeting with Trautman on August 29, 2005 "Bishop Trautman decided that in order to preclude further scandal, these additional witnesses should not be contacted, especially given the fact that it is not likely that they will lead to information concerning delicts involving minors under 16 years of age."

In August 2019, the Pennsylvania Superior Court denied the Diocese of Altoona-Johnstown’s motion to toss a lawsuit which had been filed by a woman who claimed a pedophile priest consistently molested her in the 1970s and ’80s in Blair County. In February 2020, the Diocese of Altoona-Johnstown was hit with a wave of new lawsuits.

See also

 Catholic Church by country
 Catholic Church in the United States
 Ecclesiastical Province of Philadelphia
 Global organisation of the Catholic Church
 List of Roman Catholic archdioceses (by country and continent)
 List of Roman Catholic dioceses (alphabetical) (including archdioceses)
 List of Roman Catholic dioceses (structured view) (including archdioceses)
 List of the Catholic dioceses of the United States

References

External links 
Roman Catholic Diocese of Altoona-Johnstown Official Site

 
Christian organizations established in 1901
Altoona-Johnstown
Altoona-Johnstown
Altoona, Pennsylvania
1901 establishments in Pennsylvania